The National Unity Democratic Organisation (NUDO) is a political party in Namibia. It has been represented in the National Assembly of Namibia and in the National Council of Namibia since it split from the Democratic Turnhalle Alliance (now PDM) prior to the 2004 general and local elections. The party's president is Esther Muinjangue.

History
NUDO was founded by Mburumba Kerina, Clemens Kapuuo, and Hosea Kutako in September 1965 at the suggestion of the Herero Chief’s Council. It was thus, at that time, an organisation that had mainly Herero followers. At the 1975-1977 Turnhalle Constitutional Conference, several ethnically based parties agreed to join the Democratic Turnhalle Alliance to form one joint opposition to SWAPO which at that time had turned the struggle for Namibian independence into a guerrilla war.

NUDO remained part of the DTA until it withdrew in September 2003, accusing the DTA of failing to work for Herero interests. The party then held a congress in January 2004.

Leadership
Esther Utjiua Muinjangue became the party’s first elected female president and the first elected female leader of a Namibian political party when she defeated the Okakarara constituency councillor, Vetaruhe Kandorozu, at the party’s third elective congress, which took place on 25–26 March 2019. At the elective congress, which was held in Windhoek, Peter Kazongominja was elected vice president and Joseph Kauandenge was elected secretary-general of the party. Muinjangue defeated the councillor by 240 to 227 votes.

Electoral history

Presidential elections

National Assembly elections

Local elections 

In the parliamentary election held on 15 and 16 November 2004, the party won 4.1% of popular votes and 3 out of 78 seats. Herero Chief Kuaima Riruako, the President of NUDO, was its candidate in the concurrent presidential election, placing fourth with 4.23% of the national vote. NUDO president Kuaima Riruako died on 2 June 2014, and was succeeded by Asser Mbai. in the 2014 National Assembly elections NUDO won 2 seats which went to president Asser Mbai and secretary-general Meundju Jahanika.

References

Political parties in Namibia
Political parties established in 1965
1965 establishments in South West Africa